Deoghar Airport  is a domestic airport serving Deoghar in the state of Jharkhand, India. It is situated approximately 12 kilometres (7.4 mi) from the city centre. The airport has been primarily developed to serve the region of North-Eastern part of Jharkhand and some districts of West Bengal and Bihar. It also caters millions of pilgrims of Baidyanath Temple across the country. The airport has a 2,500 meter long runway, capable of handling Airbus A320, A321 and Boeing 737 type of aircraft. Prime Minister Narendra Modi laid the foundation stone of development for the airport on 25 May 2018, and was inaugurated on 12 July 2022.

History 
The Government of Jharkhand had signed a Memorandum of Understanding (MoU) with the Airports Authority of India (AAI) in 2013, to construct the airport, to promote religious tourism in the state.

The Government later signed a tripartite MoU with the AAI and Defence Research and Development Organisation (DRDO) in March 2017, to develop the airport for non-military use and for the operations of Airbus A320 and C-130 category aircraft. The construction of the Airport was completed on 2022. The airport received its aerodrome license from Directorate General of Civil Aviation, India (DGCA) in April 2022, for regular use of the airport for flight operations, under public use category later on in 28 June 2022, the DGCA upgraded its aerodrome licence from 3C to 4C allowing commercial aircraft operations up to Airbus 321 and Boeing 737.  The first trial flight was done in June 2022, on Deoghar Airport by IndiGo from Kolkata before its commercial operations.

On 12 July 2022, The airport was inaugurated by Prime Minister Narendra Modi. Scheduled commercial operation commenced on 12 June 2022 by IndiGo on Deoghar- Kolkata route under RCS Udan Scheme.

Infrastructure 
AAI has built the airport at a cost of ₹ 400 crore. The 4,000-square-metre terminal has a capacity to handle over five lakhs passenger annually.

The terminal building has six check-in counters and two arrival belts with a peak hour handling capacity of 200 passengers. The design of the terminal building is inspired from the Baidyanath Temple's structure, and there are murals and paintings of Adivasi art, handicrafts and local tourist sites inside the airport. The airport runway is not equipped with Instrument landing system (ILS) and therefore is not capable for takeoff and landing at nights. A DVOR navigational facility is also started. Construction commenced in January 2018 and was completed in May 2022.

The adequate infrastructure and basic public facilities have been put in place in the terminal ensuring convenient and user-friendly experience for passengers thereby smooth flight operations from the airport.

UDAN Scheme 
In April 2021, IndiGo was selected to operate flights from Deoghar to Kolkata, Ranchi and Patna, under the Government's Regional Connectivity Scheme called UDAN. For non RCS UDAN route, Flights for Delhi was started on 30 July 2022 and for other destinations that includes both Mumbai and Bengaluru are expected to start in upcoming months.

Airlines and destinations

See also 
 Birsa Munda Airport
 Bokaro Airport
 Dumka Airport
 Dalbhumgarh Airport
 List of Airports in India
 List of Airports in Jharkhand

References 

Airports in Jharkhand
Transport in Deoghar
Airports established in 2022
2022 establishments in India